UM Press may refer to:
University of Manitoba Press
University of Massachusetts Press
University of Michigan Press
University of Minnesota Press
University of Missouri Press